There are at least 2 named lakes and reservoirs in Searcy County, Arkansas.

Lakes
According to the United States Geological Survey, there are no named lakes in Searcy County, Arkansas.

Reservoirs
Baker Lake, el.  
Lake Ferguson, el.

See also
 List of lakes in Arkansas

Notes

Bodies of water of Searcy County, Arkansas
Searcy